Scalenostoma is a genus of very small ectoparasitic sea snails, marine gastropod mollusks or micromollusks in   the Eulimidae family. .

Species
Species within the genera Scalenostoma include:
 Scalenostoma babylonia (Bartsch, 1912)
 Scalenostoma carinatum Deshayes, 1863
 Scalenostoma lodderae (Petterd, 1884)
 Scalenostoma perrierae Barros, Padovan & Santos, 2001
 Scalenostoma subulatum (Broderip, 1832)
 Taxon inquirendum
 Scalenostoma mariei P. Fischer, 1886 
 Species brought into synonymy
 Scalenostoma abbreviata (Mörch, 1875): synonym of Scalenostoma subulatum (Broderip, 1832)
 Scalenostoma apiculatum Souverbie, 1875: synonym of Scalenostoma carinatum Deshayes, 1863
 Scalenostoma corallina (Chemnitz, 1795): synonym of Scalenostoma subulatum (Broderip, 1832)
 Scalenostoma deshayesi A. Adams, 1870: synonym of Scalenostoma carinatum Deshayes, 1863
 Scalenostoma hawaiiensis (Pilsbry, 1920): synonym of Scalenostoma subulatum (Broderip, 1832)
 Scalenostoma latior (Pilsbry, 1917): synonym of Scalenostoma carinatum Deshayes, 1863
 Scalenostoma lubricum P. Fischer, 1886: synonym of Scalenostoma carinatum Deshayes, 1863
 Scalenostoma pyramidata Laseron, 1951: synonym of Megastomia pyramidata (Laseron, 1951)
 Scalenostoma remotissimus (Pilsbry, 1921): synonym of Scalenostoma subulatum (Broderip, 1832)
 Scalenostoma robusta (Petterd, 1884): synonym of Scalenostoma lodderae (Petterd, 1884)
 Scalenostoma striatum Hedley, 1905: synonym of Trochostilifer striatus (Hedley, 1905)
 Scalenostoma subcarina Laseron, 1951: synonym of Megastomia subcarina (Laseron, 1951)
 Scalenostoma suteri W. R. B. Oliver, 1915: synonym of Pyramidelloides suteri (W. R. B. Oliver, 1915)
 Scalenostoma thomasiae (Sowerby, 1878): synonym of Scalenostoma subulatum (Broderip, 1832)
 Scalenostoma thomasii (Sowerby, 1884): synonym of Scalenostoma subulatum (Broderip, 1832)

References

 Warén A. (1980). Revision of the genera Thyca, Stilifer, Scalenostoma, Mucronalia and Echineulima (Mollusca, Prosobranchia, Eulimidae). Zoologica Scripta 9: 187-210
 Warén A. (1984) A generic revision of the family Eulimidae (Gastropoda, Prosobranchia). Journal of Molluscan Studies suppl. 13: 1-96

External links 
 Deshayes, 1863 Catalogue des Mollusques de l'ile de la Réunion (Bourbon): 58
 Pilsbry, 1917 Marine mollusks of Hawaii, I-III; Proceedings of the Academy of Natural Sciences of Philadelphia, 69: 226, 227
 Laseron, C. F. (1955). Revision of the New South Wales eulimoid shells. The Australian Zoologist. 12 (2): 83-107, 3 pl

Eulimidae